The 2021 City of Bradford Metropolitan District Council election took place on 6 May 2021 to elect members of City of Bradford Metropolitan District Council in England. This was on the same day as other local elections. One-third of seats were up for election, with three wards (Bingley Rural, Keighley Central, and Wharfedale) electing two councillors.

Results

Ward results

Baildon

Bingley

Bingley Rural

Bolton and Undercliffe

Bowling and Barkerend

Bradford Moor

City

Clayton and Fairweather Green

Craven

Eccleshill

Great Horton

Heaton

Idle and Thackley

Ilkley

Keighley Central

Keighley East

Keighley West

Little Horton

Manningham

Queensbury

Royds 

Trevor Walsh (Conservative) was previously nominated but withdrew.

Shipley

Thornton and Allerton

Toller 

Waqas Hussain (Conservative) was previously nominated but withdrew.

Tong

Wharfedale

Wibsey

Windhill and Wrose

Worth Valley

Wyke

References 

City of Bradford Metropolitan District Council elections
Bradford